L. spicata may refer to:
 Liatris spicata, the dense blazing star or prairie gay feather, an herbaceous perennial plant species.
 Liriope spicata, a flowering plant species native East Asia.
 Lobelia spicata, a flowering plant species in the genus Lobelia.
 Lobelia spicata var. spicata, a subspecies found in Ohio.
 Luzula spicata, the spiked woodrush, a flowering plant species.

See also
 Spicata (disambiguation)